Alessandro Romairone (born 5 December 1999) is an Italian footballer who plays as a forward for Serie D club Derthona.

Club career
He made his professional debut in the Serie B for Carpi on 19 January 2019 against Foggia, coming in as a substitute for Alessio Sabbione in the 86th minute.

On 2 September 2019, he signed with Serie C club Pro Vercelli.

On 30 October 2021, he moved to Derthona in Serie D.

Family 
He is the son of former footballer Giancarlo Romainore.

References

External links
 
 

1999 births
Living people
People from Vercelli
Footballers from Piedmont
Italian footballers
Association football forwards
Serie B players
Serie C players
Serie D players
U.S. Sassuolo Calcio players
A.C. Carpi players
F.C. Pro Vercelli 1892 players
A.S.D. HSL Derthona players
Sportspeople from the Province of Vercelli